Revanche is a 2008 Austrian thriller film written and directed by Götz Spielmann. It centers on the ill-fated love story between a Viennese ex-con and a Ukrainian prostitute who get involved in a bank robbery.

The film premiered at the Berlin International Film Festival in February 2008. It received critical acclaim and won a number of awards, and was nominated for the 2009 Academy Award for Best Foreign Language Film.

Plot
Alex, an ex-convict living in Vienna and working as muscle at a brothel, starts a relationship with Tamara, a Ukrainian prostitute who works there.  Alex plans to rob a bank in a small village, then hide out with his grandfather Hausner, who lives there, before leaving with Tamara to start a new life together.  He lets an anxious and clingy Tamara accompany him on the robbery.  They have a run-in with a local policeman named Robert outside the bank, and Tamara is accidentally killed when Robert fires at their fleeing car.  A despondent Alex escapes and hides out at Hausner's farm as planned.

Robert's marriage to his wife Susanne is strained, as he is apparently unable to conceive a child, and his repressed guilt over the shooting worsens this strain.  They happen to be neighbors to Hausner, with whom Susanne is good friends, and she encounters Alex while visiting him.  Alex learns Susanne's husband was the shooter, and begins stalking Robert with a loaded gun.  An oblivious Susanne propositions Alex during a visit to the farm, and the two commence an affair.  Robert suffers a panic attack at work and is put on suspension, finally opening up to Susanne about his guilt over the shooting and general self-loathing.

Alex confronts Robert in the woods, questioning him about the shooting in veiled terms.  Robert admits his regret, but also chastises the robber (in third person) for needlessly bringing Tamara along, suggesting he has caught on to Alex's identity.  Alex throws his gun in the pond.  As Hausner's health deteriorates, Alex resolves to stay at the farm and look after it in his stead.  Susanne successfully gets pregnant by Alex, passing it off as Robert's child.  She visits Alex to cut off their affair and recognizes a photo of Tamara, realizing Alex was the robber.  Alex agrees to keep their tryst a secret, and expresses no further intention of harming Robert as he returns to work on the farm.

Cast
 Johannes Krisch as Alex
 Irina Potapenko as Tamara
 Andreas Lust as Robert
 Ursula Strauss as Susanne
 Hannes Thanheiser as Hausner
 Hanno Pöschl as Konecny

Production

Film distribution in Austria is by Filmladen, while the world rights are held by The Match Factory, Cologne. The film was promoted by the Austrian Film Institute (Österreichisches Filminstitut) and the state of Lower Austria.

Production design was by Maria Gruber, who won the Femina Film Prize for it. Heinz Ebner was responsible for the sound. Film production was carried out entirely by the company Listo in Vienna.

Filming locations
Large parts of the film were shot in the area round Gföhl and Ottenschlag in the Waldviertel.

Release
The film opened on 12 February 2009 in German cinemas and was subsequently released at different times in various European countries and the United States over the following months.

Awards submission
The film was submitted on 1 September 2008 by the Austrian Film Commission as the Austrian entry for selection for the Oscars in the Best Foreign-Language Film category, and on 22 January 2009 was nominated by the Academy of Motion Picture Arts and Sciences out of 67 entries as one of five films. This was the third time that Austria had submitted a film by Spielmann: the first two were The Stranger (Die Fremde) (2000) and Antares (2004). Director Götz Spielmann did not appear especially surprised at the film being short-listed, as it was "already obvious" that "'Revanche' will be unusually well received in the USA". He did not think an actual nomination impossible, but it would be a close-run thing. Spielmann saw three other favorites for distinction in this category–Waltz with Bashir, The Class and Everlasting Moments–which apart from the last were also among the nominees.

Critical reception
Following the world premiere at the Berlin International Film Festival 2008 the film had excellent reviews around the world and received several awards. Varietys Alissa Simon noted: 
"Elegantly spinning primal elements of guilt, revenge, faith and redemption, helmer's [sic] gripping fifth feature is prime fest material that's likely to rate Euro arthouse exposure, with further viewers in ancillary. (...) Stillness and sounds of nature play a key role in creating pic's intense atmosphere. (...) Asking the question, "Whose fault is it if life doesn't go your way?," the cleverly constructed script introduces some fresh and surprising twists and turns. (...) Impressive lensing from Martin Gschlacht, the key cinematographer for Austria's young helmers [sic], provides simplicity and clarity, while concise cutting by Karina Ressler allows no gratuitous moments in a pic that clocks in at just over two hours. With Revanche his strongest work yet, Spielmann creates high expectations for the future."

In January 2009 it was announced that Revanche was nominated for the Academy Award for Best Foreign Language Film.

Revanche was placed at 90 on Slant Magazines best films of the 2000s.

Revanche has an approval rating of 96% on review aggregator website Rotten Tomatoes, based on 83 reviews, and an average rating of 7.89/10. The website's critical consensus states, "With Revanche, Götz Spielmann has crafted a debut as surprising as it is suspenseful". It also has a score of 84 out of 100 on Metacritic, based on 22 critics, indicating "universal acclaim".

Awards
 Berlin International Film Festival 2008
 European Cinemas Label as Best European Film of the Panorama section
 Art-Cinéma-Award 2008 of the CICAE (Confédération Internationale des Cinémas D´Art et Essai)
 Femina film award of the Verband der Filmarbeiterinnen to Maria Gruber for the production design
 Diagonale 2008:
 Grand Award as Best Austrian feature film
 Spezial Award of the Jury for actress Ursula Strauss
 Diagonale-Prize of the Association of Austrian Cinematographers to Martin Gschlacht for best cinematography in a feature film
 Tromsø International Film Festival 2008 (Norway):
 FIPRESCI Award
 First Prize Aurora
 Palm Springs International Film Festival 2008: FIPRESCI-Award as Best Foreign Language Film of the Year

Awards from smaller film festivals: at the Filmkunstfest 2008 in Mecklenburg-Vorpommern (Fliegender Ochse as best feature film), at the Monterrey International Film Festival 2008 (Best Screenplay and Audience Award), at the Fünf Seen Filmfestival in Starnberg (First Prize Star 2008), and at the International Filmfestival Motovun (From A to A-Award).

References

External links
 
 
 
 
 www.revanche.at (English version)
 Video interview with Götz Spielmann at MUBI (April 2009).
Revanche: Revival of the Fittest an essay by Armond White at the Criterion Collection

2008 films
2000s crime films
2008 romantic drama films
2008 psychological thriller films
2000s German-language films
2000s Russian-language films
Austrian drama films
Films about religion
Films about revenge
Films set in Austria
Films shot in Vienna